Santa Monica is an unincorporated community in Bay County, Florida, United States. It is part of the Panama City–Lynn Haven–Panama City Beach Metropolitan Statistical Area. Its population is 60.

Santa Monica is located along State Road 30 (former US 98 Alternate) west of Laguna Beach.

References
http://www.santamonicafl.com

Unincorporated communities in Bay County, Florida
Unincorporated communities in Florida
Populated coastal places in Florida on the Gulf of Mexico